The Lure is a 1933 British crime film directed by Arthur Maude and starring Anne Grey, Cyril Raymond and Alec Fraser. It was made at Wembley Studios as a quota quickie.

Cast
 Anne Grey as Julia Waring  
 Cyril Raymond as Paul Dane  
 Alec Fraser as John Baxter  
 William Hartnell as Billy  
 Philip Clarke as Peter Waring  
 P.G. Clark as Merritt  
 Doris Long as Dorothy 
 Jean Ormond

References

Bibliography
 Chibnall, Steve. Quota Quickies: The Birth of the British 'B' Film. British Film Institute, 2007.
 Low, Rachael. Filmmaking in 1930s Britain. George Allen & Unwin, 1985.
 Wood, Linda. British Films, 1927-1939. British Film Institute, 1986.

External links
 

1933 films
British crime films
1933 crime films
Films shot at Wembley Studios
Quota quickies
Films directed by Arthur Maude
British black-and-white films
1930s English-language films
1930s British films